The serval is a type of feline.

Serval may also refer to:

 Armstrong Siddeley Serval, aircraft engine
 LIV (SO) Serval, german military vehicle
 VBMR Serval, french military vehicle
 La Chapelle-en-Serval, commune in northern France
 Operation Serval, French operation in Mali
 Serval, Aisne, commune in northern France
 Serval project, a project providing infrastructure for direct connections between cellular phones